Clytra appendicina is a species of leaf beetles from the subfamily Cryptocephalinae. Some authors consider it to be a subspecies of Clytra quadripunctata. The species is rare in its range. It is distributed in  South and southern Central Europe, Asia Minor and Central Asia. It was first discovered in the northern part of Turkey.

References

Beetles described in 1848
Beetles of Asia
Beetles of Europe
Clytrini